Miriam is a feminine given name recorded in Biblical Hebrew, recorded in the Book of Exodus as the name of the sister of Moses, the prophetess Miriam.

Spelling variants include French Myriam, German Mirjam, Mirijam; hypocoristic forms include Mira,  Miri and Mimi (commonly given in Israel).

The name's etymology is unclear. Since many Levite names are of Egyptian origin, the name could come from the Egyptian   mr "love", as in the Egyptian names mry.t-jmn (Merit-Amun) "beloved of Amun" and mry.t-rꜥ (Merytre) "beloved of Ra".

An older Grecian pronunciation of this name, Maryām (Μαριάμ), is found in the Greek Old Testament (3rd century BCE) and in the New Testament manuscripts as the name of several women, including Mary, mother of Jesus and  Mary Magdalene.
Variants of this name include Greek and Latin Maria, whence French Marie and English Mary.

Variant Maryam
Mary, mother of the Jesus of the New Testament, bore a Judeo-Aramaic variant of this name, Maryām (מרים). In the New Testament of the Bible, written in Greek, her name is transliterated Mariam (Μαριάμ) or Maria. Several other women in the New Testament, including St. Mary Magdalene, are called by the same name.

In antiquity, it was variously etymologized as  "rebellion", "bitter sea", "strong waters", "exalted one", "ruling one", "wished for child", or "beautiful".

St. Jerome (writing c. 390), following Eusebius of Caesarea, translates the name as "drop of the sea" (stilla maris in Latin), from Hebrew מר mar "drop" (cf. Isaias 40:15) and ים yam "sea". 
This translation was subsequently rendered stella maris ("star of the sea") due to scribal error or as a result of 3rd century vowel shifts, from which comes the Virgin Mary's title Star of the Sea.

Alternatively, the name can be interpreted "star of the sea" if taken as a contracted form of the Hebrew מאור ma'or "star" (lit. "luminary") plus ים yam "sea", yet this "strikes as a very free interpretation".

Rashi, an 11th-century Jewish commentator on the Bible, wrote that the name was given to the sister of Moses because of the Egyptians' harsh treatment of Jews in Egypt. Rashi wrote that the Israelites lived in Egypt for two hundred ten years, including eighty-six years of cruel enslavement that began at the time Moses' elder sister was born. Therefore, the girl was called Miriam, because the Egyptians made life bitter (מַר, mar) for her people.

Because of Mary's great religious significance, variants of her name are often given to girl children in both the Western and Arab worlds. In the Quran, Mary's name assumed the Arabic form Maryam (مريم), which has also passed into other languages. The Greek variant Maria passed into Latin and from thence into many modern European languages.

Notable people named Miriam

Ancient
 Biblical Miriam, the sister of Moses
 Mary the Jewess, also known as Miriam the Prophetess, an early alchemist believed to have lived some time between the first and third centuries AD 
 Woman with seven sons, Jewish martyr named in Lamentations Rabbah as Miriam bat Tanhum

Medieval
 Miriam, daughter of Rashi

Modern
 Miriam, Princess of Turnovo (b.1963), Spanish jewellery designer
 Miriam Ben-Porat (1918–2012), Israeli judge and state comptroller
 Miriam Esther Brailey (1900–1976), American physician
 Miriam Brouwer (born 1991), Canadian cyclist
 Miriam Butterworth (1918–2019), American educator, politician, and activist
 Miriam Cani (born 1985), Albanian singer
 Miriam Caracciolo di Melito (1888-1966), American socialite and Italian countess
 Miriam Daly (1928–1980), Irish civil rights activist and republican leader
 Miriam Flynn (born 1952), American voice artist and character actress
 Miriam Gallardo (born 1968), Peruvian volleyball player
 Miriam Goldberg (1916–2017), American newspaper publisher and editor
 Miriam Gonzalez (born 1977), Playboy playmate
 Miriam González Durántez (born 1968), Spanish international trade lawyer and wife of former Deputy Prime Minister of the United Kingdom Nick Clegg
 Miriam Hodgson (1938–2005), British editor of children's books
 Mirjam Indermaur (born 1967), Swiss author
 Miriam Israeli (born 1966), American-Israeli singer and lyricist
 Miriam Kara (born 1938), Israeli Olympic gymnast
 Miriam Leone (born 1985), Miss Italia 2008
 Miriam Leslie (1828–1914), American author, publisher, woman suffrage advocate, and philanthropist
 Miriam Lexmann (born 1972), Slovak politician
 Miriam Makeba (1932–2008), South African singer and activist
 Miriam Margolyes (born 1941), British actress
 Miriam McDonald (born 1987), Canadian actress, star of Degrassi: The Next Generation
 Miriam Miranda, Honduran human rights activist
 Miriam Moses (1884–1965), British politician
 Miriam O'Callaghan (media personality) (born 1960), Irish television presenter
 Miriam Pirazzini (1918–2016), Italian singer
 Mirjam Pressler (1940–2019), German novelist and translator
 Miriam Quiambao (born 1975), Filipino entertainer and beauty pageant titleholder
 Miriam Ramón (born 1973), Ecuadorian racewalker
 Miriam Soledad Raudez Rodríguez, Nicaraguan politician
 Miriam Roth (1910–2005), Israeli educationist
 Miriam Defensor Santiago (1945–2016), Senator in the Philippines
 Miriam Shaviv (born 1976), literary editor of the Jerusalem Post
 Miriam Siderenski (born 1941), Israeli Olympic runner
 Miriam Soares (born 1965), Brazilian footballer
 Miriam Stockley (born 1962), English South African-born singer
 Miriam Stoppard (born 1937), British physician, author, television presenter, and agony aunt
 Miriam Syowia Kyambi (born 1979), Kenyan artist
 Miriam Timothy (1879–1950), British harpist
 Miriam Toews (born 1964), Canadian author
 Miriam Beizana Vigo (born 1990), Spanish writer and literary critic
 Miriam Weeks (born 1995), pseudonym Belle Knox, American former pornographic actress
 Miriam Yalan-Shteklis (1900–1984), Israeli writer and poet
 Miriam Zetter (born 1989), Mexican ten-pin bowler

Pseudonyms
 Miriam Yeung, stage name of Yeung Chin-wah (楊千嬅, born 1974), Hong Kong singer-actress
 Miriam (TV personality), Mexican transgender television personality.

Notable people named Myriam
The letter y in the transliteration Miryam represents the palatal glide /j/.
The metathesized spelling Myriam has also gained some currency, especially  in France, alongside Miriam and Miryam.

The name of Israeli or Lebanese people called "Miriam" may be transliterated Miryam or Myriam depending on whether the context of the transliteration is French or English.

French-speaking
Myriam Abel or Myriam Morea (born 1981), French singer of Algerian descent
Myriam Baverel (born 1981), French martial artist
Myriam Bédard (born 1969), retired Canadian athlete
Myriam Bru (born 1930), French actress
Myriam Birger (born 1951), French pianist
Myriam Boileau (born 1977), Canadian diver
Myriam Fox-Jerusalmi (born 1961), French canoeist
Myriam Glez (born 1980), French swimmer
Myriam Korfanty (born 1978), French handball player
Myriam Lignot (born 1975), French synchronized swimmer
Myriam Léonie Mani (born 1977), Cameroonian athlete
Myriam Merlet (c. 1957–2010), Haitian political activist
Myriam Muller (born 1971), Luxembourgian actress
Myriam Sirois (born 1975), Canadian actress  
Myriam Soumaré (born 1986), French athlete
Myriam Verreault, Canadian film director and screenwriter

Others
Myriam Casanova (born 1985), Swiss tennis player
Myriam Montemayor Cruz (born 1981), Mexican pop star known as "Myriam"
Myriam Fares (ميريام فارس  born 1983), Lebanese singer
Myriam Flühmann (born 1986), Swiss figure skater
Myriam Hernández (born 1967), Chilean singer-songwriter and television presenter
Myriam Leuenberger (born 1987), Swiss figure skater
Myriam Marbe (1931–1997), Romanian composer and pianist
Myriam Moscona (born 1955), Mexican journalist
Myriam Palacios (1936–2013), Chilean actress and comedian
Myriam Sarachik (1933–2021), Belgian physicist
Myriam Shehab (ميريام شهاب, born 1982), Lebanese singer
Myriam Sienra (1939–2020), Paraguayan actress
Myriam Vanlerberghe (born 1961), Belgian politician
Myriam Yardeni (1932–2015), Romanian-born Israeli historian

Pseudonyms
Myriam François, pseudonym of Emilie François (born 1983), British writer, broadcaster, and academic; former actress

Fictional characters
 Miriam, a main character in Nathaniel Hawthorne's novel The Marble Faun (1860)
 Miriam Rooth in Henry James's novel The Tragic Muse (1890)
 Miriam Leveirs in D.H. Lawrence's novel Sons and Lovers (1913)
 Miriam, the title character (or characters) of Truman Capote's eponymous short story, his first widely acclaimed fictional work from 1949
 Miriam Blaylock in the 1983 film The Hunger
 Miriam Godwinson, a faction leader in the video game Sid Meier's Alpha Centauri (1999)
 Miriam in The Thieves of Ostia (2001)
 Miriam Pataki in the cartoon Hey Arnold! (2004)
 Miriam, the fictional protagonist of Bloodstained: Ritual of the Night and a playable character in its companion game Bloodstained: Curse of the Moon
 Miriam, the other name of Queen Marion in the 4kids version of Winx Club (2004)
 Myriam Scuttlebutt in the video game Phoenix Wright: Ace Attorney − Dual Destinies (2013)
 Miriam “Midge” Maisel, the titular character in the TV series The Marvelous Mrs. Maisel (2017)
 Miriam Mendelsohn, a character in Disney/Pixar's 2022 animated film Turning Red
Queen Miriam, the supporting character of Winx Club whose original name is Marion, but was renamed Miriam for the 4kids dubbed version of the Italian show's first three seasons and seventy-eight episodes.
Miramir is minor character of Star Wars is mother of Rey
Miriam Jacobs is a one-off character in Philip Pullman's The Secret Commonwealth
Miriam is the school nurse in Pokemon Scarlet and Violet

See also
Maryam (name)

References

External links

Behind the Name: Mary
Meaning, origin and etymology of the name Miriam, Abarim Publications

Hebrew feminine given names
English feminine given names
Jewish feminine given names
Feminine given names